Sæle Church is a parish church of the Church of Norway in Sogndal Municipality in Vestland county, Norway. It is located in the village of Sæle, on the northern shore of the Sognefjorden. It is one of two churches for the Balestrand parish which is part of the Sogn prosti (deanery) in the Diocese of Bjørgvin. The yellow, wooden church was built in a long church design with a Romanesque revival style in 1903 using plans drawn up by the architect Hans Jacob Sparre from Oslo. The church seats about 170 people.

History
Sæle Church was built to replace the centuries-old stone Kvamsøy Church on the nearby island of Kvamsøy. This decision was not made lightly, but after much discussion, debate, and strife among the local population in the parish. The new church was designed by Hans Jacob Sparre and built by builder Anders Korsvold. The church was consecrated on 28 April 1903 by the Bishop Johan Willoch Erichsen. In 1954, electric heating was installed in the church. Sæle Church (and Kvamsøy Church before that) had always belonged to Vik parish (and municipality), but in 1964, it was transferred to the Balestrand parish (and municipality). In 1998, a bathroom was constructed as an extension to the existing church porch.

Media gallery

See also
List of churches in Bjørgvin

References

Sogndal
Churches in Vestland
Long churches in Norway
Wooden churches in Norway
20th-century Church of Norway church buildings
Churches completed in 1903
1903 establishments in Norway